Titta may refer to:

People
 Cesare De Titta (1862–1933), Italian poet in Italian, Latin and in Neapolitan Abruzzese
 Mastro Titta, nickname of Giovanni Battista Bugatti (1779–1869), Italian executioner
 Giovanni Titta Rosa (1891–1972), Italian literary critic, poet and novelist
 Titta Jokinen (born 1951), Finnish actress
 Titta Ruffo, Italian operatic baritone
 Titta As a part of Bahamian culture the word Titta is a title for the oldest sister (sometimes used before the name; mostly used alone).

Places
 Titta (Città di Castello), frazione of the comune of Città di Castello in the Province of Perugia, Umbria, central Italy